Stephen Peter Rishworth (born 8 June 1980) is an English former footballer who played as a midfielder in the Football League for Wrexham.

Career
Rishworth started as a trainee at Manchester City before moving to Wrexham's youth team in 1996. He made four appearances in the Football League Second Division at the start of the 1998–99 season, all as a substitute.

Rishworth then left professional football to study engineering at Balliol College, Oxford.

References

1980 births
Living people
Sportspeople from Chester
English footballers
Association football midfielders
Manchester City F.C. players
Wrexham A.F.C. players
English Football League players
Alumni of Balliol College, Oxford